Greg Brooker may refer to:

 Greg Brooker (screenwriter), American screenwriter
 Greg Brooker (music producer) (born 1981), British music producer